JCSAT-4B, known as JCSAT-13 (formerly known as Lippostar-1) before launch, is a geostationary communications satellite operated by SKY Perfect JSAT Group (JSAT) which was designed and manufactured by Lockheed Martin on the A2100 platform.

Satellite description
The spacecraft was designed and manufactured by Lockheed Martin on the A2100 satellite bus. As most satellites based on the A2100 platform, it uses a  LEROS-1C LAE for orbit raising.

Its payload is composed of thirty-two 27 MHz and twelve 36 MHz Ku band transponders, for a total bandwidth of 1.296 GHz, and  it is used primarily for multi-channel pay per view business. Besides the main beam, it has two steerable beams that enables it to reconfigure in orbit its services.

It's mainly used for broadcasting digital televisions channels It has two fixed beams named Japan Beam and South East Asia Beam. The former offers coverage from the Middle and Near East through South West Asia, South East Asia and Oceania. With the latter mainly covering Indonesia and Malaysia. In addition to the two fixed beams, it offers two steerable beams to cover zones where demands has surpassed the fixed beam capacity.

History
On April 16, 2009, JSAT made its seventh order for an A2100-based satellite from Lockheed, the JCSAT-13 and Lippostar-1. It would feature 44 Ku band transponders with two steerable antennas for on-orbit reconfiguration. It was to be launched in 2013 for the 124°East slot where it would replace JCSAT-4A. The next day, April 17, Arianespace announced that they had secured the contract to launch JCSAT-13 on an Ariane 5 ECA.

On March 23, 2012, JSAT announced that the expected launch date for JCSAT-13 was May 15. Also, that it would replace JCSAT-4A at the 124° East slot to offer the SKY PerfecTV! digital broadcasting service. As scheduled, on May 15 as 22:13 UTC, an Ariane 5 ECA, successfully launched JCSAT-13 and Vinasat-2 to a geostationary transfer orbit. JCSAT-13 separated from the top berth at 22:39 UTC, and first signals were acquired at 23:20 UTC. After the launch success, JCSAT-13 was renamed JCSAT-4B.

On the same day of the launch, JSAT announced an agreement with the Lippo Group to use JCSAT-4B to offer a direct-to-home satellite TV broadcast service across Indonesia. After reaching the 124°East, it was commissioned into service on July 10, replacing JCSAT-4A.

References

Communications satellites in geostationary orbit
Satellites using the A2100 bus
Spacecraft launched in 2012
Communications satellites of Japan
Satellites of Japan